Ardeshiri-ye Bala (also Romanized as Ardeshīrī-ye Bālā; also known as Ardeshīrī-ye ‘Olyā) is a village in Sornabad Rural District, Hamaijan District, Sepidan County, Fars Province, Iran. At the 2006 census, its population was 343, in 79 families.

References 

Populated places in Sepidan County